Denise Tolkowsky (11 August 1918 – 9 March 1991) was an English-born pianist and composer.

Biography
Denise Tolkowsky was born in Brighton, England, the daughter of a Russian father and Flemish singer and actress Anna Kennes. She studied music at the Royal Flemish Conservatory in Antwerp, with E. Durlet for piano, Edward Verheyden for harmony, Karel Candael for counterpoint and fugue and Flor Alpaerts for composition. She married pianist Alex de Vries and worked as a composer and concert pianist, sometimes performing in a duo with de Vries. He committed suicide in May 1964 and Tolkowsky set up Alex de Vries Fund in his honor, an organization to assist young musicians in starting their careers. Tolkowsky became director of the Flemish region of Yehudi Menuhin's Live Music Now in 1980. She died in Antwerp, Belgium.

Honors and awards
Honors and awards included:
International dance competition in Brussels, 1931
International Viotti Competition in Italy, silver medal
Young Talent competition in Brussels
Ferris-Tolkowsky Prize
Anna Kennedy Prize

Works
Tolkowsky wrote for theater, orchestra, chamber ensemble, solo piano and voice. She also wrote a number of songs. Selected works include:

't kwezelke ballet, 1931
Le Jeu du Coeur ballet, 1939
People Of Earth ballet, 1939
Camp for mezzo soprano and chamber orchestra, text by Marcel Coole, 1939
Homage to Béla Bartók for flute, violin, piano and percussion, 1950
Adagio for Strings for orchestra, 1950.
Sonatine for piano
Rhythmic for piano
Etudes for piano
Preludes for piano
Variations for piano
Concerto for piano and orchestra, 1958
Variations on a Russian theme, 1961

References

1918 births
1991 deaths
20th-century classical composers
British music educators
Women classical composers
English classical pianists
English women pianists
English classical composers
20th-century classical pianists
20th-century English composers
20th-century English women musicians
Women music educators
Women classical pianists
20th-century women composers
20th-century women pianists